This is a list of Catholic churches in Uruguay.

Archdiocese of Montevideo
The Roman Catholic Archdiocese of Montevideo is divided into ten Pastoral Zones.

Zone 1

 Cathedral of the Immaculate Conception, St. Philip and St. James 
 Parish Church of Our Lady of Mt. Carmel (Cordón)
 Parish Church of St. Francis of Assisi
 Parish Church of St. Michael Garicoits (Iglesia de los Vascos)
 Parish Church of St. Anthony and St. Clare 
 Parish Church of Our Lady of Lourdes and St. Vincent Pallotti
 Parish Church of St. Joseph and St. Maximilian Kolbe (Conventuales)
 Parish Church of the Sacred Heart (Seminario)
 Charity Chapel, Maciel Hospital
 Shrine of the Resurrected Lord (Tres Cruces)

Zone 2

 Parish Church of Our Lady of Mt Carmel (Aguada)
 Parish Church of the Immaculate Heart of Mary (St. Pancras)
 Parish Church of Our Lady of the Guard
 Parish Church of St Michael Archangel
 Parish Church of Saint Antoninus
 Parish Church of Our Lady of Bzommar
 Church of Our Lady of Luján (St. Expeditus)
 Parish Church of Our Lady of Mercy and St. Jude Taddhaeus, which is also a pilgrimage sanctuary

Zone 3

 Parish Church of Our Lady of Sorrows (Reducto)
 Parish Church of St. Charles Borromeo and Our Lady of the Assumption
 Parish Church of Our Lady of Perpetual Help and St. Alphonsus (Tapes)
 Chapel of Our Lady of the Rosary (Maturana)
 Parish Church of the Holy Family (Jackson Chapel)
 Parish Church of Our Lady of Mt. Carmel and St. Saint Thérèse of Lisieux (Carmelites)

Zone 4

 Parish Church of Our Lady of Help (Cerro)
 Parish Church of the Immaculate Conception (Paso Molino)
 Parish Church of St. Francis of Assisi (Nuevo París)
 Blessed Francesca Rubatto Sanctuary Chapel
 Parish Church of the Holy Family (La Teja)
 Parish Church of St. Raphael Archangel (Cerro Norte)
 Parish Church of Our Lady of the Guard and St. Aloysius Gonzaga (La Barra)
 Parish Church of the Immaculate Conception (Rincón del Cerro)
 Parish Church of Our Lady of Fatima (Cerro)
 Parish Church of the Curé of Ars and St Helena (Punta Yeguas)
 Parish Church of Jesus the Worker (Paso de la Arena)
 Parish Church of St. Alberto Hurtado

Zone 5

 Parish Church of St Albert (Peñarol)
 Parish Church of Mary Help of Christians (Villa Colón), which is also a pilgrimage sanctuary
 Parish Church of the Immaculate Conception (Paso de las Duranas)
 Parish Church of St Vincent Pallotti
 Parish Church of Our Lady of Lebanon
 Parish Church of St Mary and St Pius X (Melilla)
 Parish Church of St Mary Mother of the Church and St John Bosco (Colón)

Zone 6

 Parish Church of St. John the Baptist (Pocitos)
 Parish Church of Mary Help of Christians
 Parish Church of Our Lady of the Sacred Heart (Punta Carretas)
 Parish Church of Our Lady of Fatima
 Parish Church of Our Lady of the Rosary and St. Dominic (Dominicans) 
 Parish Church of Our Lady of the Orchard and St. Joseph
 Parish Church of St. Alexander and St. Peter Claver

Zone 7

 Parish Church of Our Lady of Lourdes (Malvín)
 Parish Church of Stella Maris (Carrasco)
 Parish Church of St. Joseph of the Mountain and St. Teresa of Avila
 Chapel of St. Joseph of the Mountain
 Parish Church of St. Rita of Cascia (Punta Gorda)
 Parish Church of St Bernadette Soubirous 
 Parish Church of Jesus the Mercyful (Belén)

Zone 8

 Sanctuary of the Miraculous Medal and St. Augustine (Unión), which is also a pilgrimage sanctuary
 Parish Church of Our Lady of Sorrows (Holy Land)
 Parish Church of Our Lady of Mt. Carmel and St. Cajetan (Comercio)
 Parish Church of the Holy Apostles
 Parish Church of St. Peter Apostle (Buceo)
 Parish Church of St Ignatius of Loyola
 Parish Church of St. Joseph the Worker
 Parish Church of St. Vincent de Paul
 Parish Church of Our Lady of the Assumption (Italian Catholic Mission)

Zone 9

 Parish Church of the Holy Savior and National Shrine Grotto of Lourdes, which is also a pilgrimage sanctuary
 Parish Church of Our Lady of Guadalupe
 National Shrine of the Heart of Jesus (Cerrito de la Victoria), which is also a pilgrimage sanctuary 
 Parish Church of the Sacred Hearts (Possolo)
 Parish Church of the Annunciation
 Parish Church of Our Lady of the Rosary of Pompei 
 Parish Church of St. Madeleine Sophie Barat (Aires Puros)
 Parish Church of St. Thérèse of Lisieux
 Parish Church of Our Lady of the Foundation
 Parish Church of St. Lawrence
 Parish Church of Our Lady of Mt. Carmel
 Parish Church of Our Lady of the Thirty-Three
 Parish Church of St. Joseph Husband of Mary

Zone 10

 Christ of Toledo Parish Church (Villa García)
 St. Joseph of Manga Chapel (Jacksonville)
 Parish Church of Our Lady of the Sacred Heart and St. Rita (Maroñas), which is also a pilgrimage sanctuary
 Parish Church of the Most Holy Trinity and the Holy Family
 Parish Church of the Sacred Heart of Jesus (Vera)  
 Parish Church of Our Lady of Perpetual Help and St Eugene (La Cruz de Carrasco)
 Mater Admirabilis Parish Church
 Parish Church of St John Bosco
 Parish Church of St Gemma Galgani

Diocese of Canelones
The Roman Catholic Diocese of Canelones covers Canelones Department:

Canelones Deanery

 Cathedral of Our Lady of Guadalupe in Canelones
 St. John the Baptist Parish Church in Santa Lucía
 St. Michael Archangel Parish Church in Los Cerrillos
 St. Thérèse of Lisieux Parish Church in Juanicó

Piedras Deanery

 Isidore the Laborer Parish Church in Las Piedras
 St. Adolphus Parish Church in El Dorado
 Our Lady of the Miraculous Medal Parish Church in San Isidro
 St. Anthony of Padua Church in Pueblo Nuevo
 Our Lady of Peace Parish Church in La Paz
 St. Anthony Mary Claret Parish Church in Progreso
 St. Mary of the Visitation Monastery in Progreso

Central Deanery

 St. Raymond Nonnatus Parish Church in San Ramón
 St. Hyacinth Parish Church in San Jacinto
 St. Anthony of Padua Parish Church in San Antonio
 St. John the Baptist Parish Church in San Bautista
 St. Rose of Lima Parish Church in Santa Rosa
 Parish Church of the Holy Family in Sauce
 Parish Church of the Most Holy Savior in Tala

Pando Deanery

 Parish Church of Our Lady of Mt. Carmel in Migues
 Parish Church of St. Joseph the Worker in Montes
 Parish Church of St. Thomas Aquinas in Soca
 Soca Chapel in Soca
 Parish Church of St. Francis of Assisi in Suárez
 St. Rose of Lima Parish Church in Empalme Olmos
 Parish Church of the Immaculate Conception in Pando
 Parish Church of Our Lady of Perpetual Help in Barros Blancos
 Parish Church of Our Lady of Mt. Carmel in Toledo

Deanery of the Beaches

 Parish Church of the Blessed Luigi Orione in La Floresta
 Shrine of the Virgin of the Flowers in Estación Floresta (Roman Catholic)
 Church of the Sacred Heart in Atlántida
 Parish Church of Christ the Worker and Our Lady of Lourdes in Estación Atlántida
 Parish Church of St. Rose of Lima in El Pinar
 Parish Church of St. Elizabeth of Hungary in Salinas
 Parish Church of St. Mary of the Angels in San José de Carrasco
 Parish Church of St. Joseph the Worker in Paso Carrasco
 Parish Church of St. Francis of Assisi in Colonia Nicolich
 Parish Church of Our Lady of the Foundation in Solymar
 Parish Church of the Most Holy Trinity in Shangrilá

Diocese of Florida
The Roman Catholic Diocese of Florida covers Florida Department and Durazno Department:

Florida Department

 Cathedral Sanctuary of Our Lady of the Thirty-Three in Florida
 St. Joseph Parish Church in Florida
 St. Thérèse of Lisieux Parish Church in Florida
 St. Conus Chapel in Florida, which is also a pilgrimage sanctuary
 St. Paul Parish Church in Mendoza Grande  
 Our Lady of the Pillar Parish Church in Sarandí Grande
 Immaculate Conception Parish Church in 25 de Mayo 
 Parish Church of the Saints Cosmas and Damian in 25 de Agosto
 St. Thérèse of Lisieux Parish Church in Chamizo
 Most Pure Heart of Mary Parish Church in Fray Marcos
 Parish Church of Our Lady of Mt. Carmel in Capilla del Sauce
 Parish Church of Mary Help of Christians in Casupá
 Exaltation of the Cross Chapel in La Cruz

Durazno Department

 St. Peter Parish Church in Durazno
 Parish Church of Our Lady of Mt. Carmel in Durazno
 St. Anthony of Padua Parish Church in Sarandí del Yí
 Parish Church of the Sacred Heart in La Paloma
 Parish Church of Our Lady of Mt. Carmel in Villa del Carmen
 Parish Church of the Sacred Heart in Carlos Reyles

Diocese of Maldonado and Punta del Este
The Roman Catholic Diocese of Maldonado-Punta del Este covers almost all of the Maldonado Department and also part of Rocha Department.

Maldonado Department

 Cathedral of St. Ferdinand in Maldonado
 Parish Church of Our Lady of the Remedies in Maldonado Nuevo
 Parish Church of Our Lady of the Thirty-Three in Maldonado
 Parish Church of St. Charles Borromeo in San Carlos
 Parish Church of St. Pius X in San Carlos
 Parish Church of Our Lady of the Rosary at La Barra
 Parish Church of Our Lady of Sorrows in Pan de Azúcar
 Parish Church of the Immaculate Conception and St. John Vianney in Piriápolis
 Parish Church of the Holy Family at Gregorio Aznárez
 Parish Church of Our Lady of Candelaria in Punta del Este
 Fatima Chapel in Punta del Este
 St. Raphael Chapel in Punta del Este
 Our Lady of Mercy Chapel in Garzón

Rocha Department (seaside)

 Parish Church of Our Lady of Remedies in Rocha
 Parish Church of Our Lady of Fatima in Rocha
 Parish Church of Our Lady of the Pigeon in La Paloma
 Parish Church of Mary Help of Christians and St. Vincent Martyr in Castillos
 Parish Church of the Assumption of the Most Holy Virgin Mary in Chuy

Diocese of Melo
The Roman Catholic Diocese of Melo covers Cerro Largo Department and Treinta y Tres Department:

Cerro Largo Department

 Cathedral of Our Lady of the Pillar and St. Raphael in Melo
 Parish Church of Our Lady of Mt. Carmel in Melo
 St. Joseph the Worker Parish Church in Melo
 Parish Church of St. Dominic Savio and St. Charles Borromeo in Melo
 Jesus Good Shepherd Parish Church in Melo
 St. John the Baptist Parish Church in Río Branco
 Most Holy Redeemer Parish Church in Fraile Muerto
 Christ the King Parish Church in Aceguá
 St. Joseph Parish Church in Tupambaé

Treinta y Tres Department

 St. Joseph the Worker Parish Church in Treinta y Tres
 Parish Church of Our Lady of the Thirty-Three in Treinta y Tres
 Parish Church of the Holy Savior in Treinta y Tres
 Mary Help of Christians Parish Church in General Enrique Martínez
 St. Clare of Assisi Parish Church in Santa Clara de Olimar
 Holy Sacrament Parish Church in Vergara
 Sacred Heart of Jesus Parish Church in Cerro Chato

Diocese of Mercedes
The Roman Catholic Diocese of Mercedes covers Soriano Department and Colonia Department:

Soriano Department

 Cathedral of Our Lady of Mercy in Mercedes
 Sacred Heart of Jesus Parish Church in Mercedes
 St. John the Baptist Parish Church in Mercedes
 St. Pius X Parish Church in Mercedes
 Parish Church of Our Lady of Luján and St. Elizabeth in Cardona
 Our Lady of Sorrows Parish Church in Dolores
 St. Dominic Soriano Chapel in Villa Soriano
 Immaculate Conception Parish Church in Palmitas
 St. Joseph the Worker Parish Church in José Enrique Rodó

Colonia Department

 Basilica of the Holy Sacrament in Colonia del Sacramento
 St. Joseph the Worker and St. John Bosco in Juan Lacaze
 Our Lady of Mt. Carmel Parish Church in Carmelo
 Our Lady of Pompei Church in Carmelo
 Most Holy Trinity Parish Church in Nueva Helvecia
 Our Lady of Schoenstatt Chapel in Nueva Helvecia, which is also a pilgrimage sanctuary
 Our Lady of Fatima Chapel in Colonia Valdense
 Holy Cross Chapel in La Paz
 Our Lady of Remedies Parish Church in Nueva Palmira
 St. Joseph and St. Michael Parish Church in Ombúes de Lavalle
 Our Lady of the Rosary Parish Church in Rosario
 St. Joseph the Worker Parish Church in Tarariras

Diocese of Minas
The Roman Catholic Diocese of Minas covers all the Lavalleja Department and also small parts of Rocha Department and Maldonado Department.

Lavalleja Department

 Cathedral of the Immaculate Conception in Minas
 St. Joseph Parish Church in Minas
 St. Thérèse of Lisieux Parish Church in Minas
 Our Lady of Fatima Parish Church in Minas
 Our Lady of Verdun National Sanctuary in Minas
 St. Nicholas of Bari Parish Church in José Batlle y Ordóñez/Nico Pérez
 St. Charles Borromeo Parish Church in José Pedro Varela
 Our Lady of Pompei Parish Church in Mariscala
 Our Lady of Mt. Carmel Parish Church in Solís de Mataojo

Rocha Department (North)

 St. Francis of Assisi Parish Church in Lascano

Maldonado Department (North)

 Parish Church of St. Anthony of Padua and Our Lady of the Valley of Aiguá in Aiguá

Diocese of Salto
The Roman Catholic Diocese of Salto covers Artigas Department, Salto Department, Paysandú Department, and Río Negro Department:

Artigas Department

 St. Eugene of the Cuareim Parish Church in Artigas
 St. Rose of Lima of the Cuareim Parish Church in Bella Unión

Paysandú Department

 Parish Church of Our Lady of the Rosary and St. Benedict of Palermo in Paysandú
 St. Raymond and St. John Bosco Parish Church in Paysandú
 Sacred Heart of Jesus Parish Church in Paysandú
 St. Joseph the Worker Parish Church in Paysandú
 Immaculate Conception Parish Church in Tambores
 St. Thérèse of Lisieux Parish Church in Quebracho
 Mary Help of Christians Parish Church in Guichón

Río Negro Department

 Our Lady of the Pillar Parish Church in Fray Bentos
 Sacred Heart of Jesus Parish Church in Young

Salto Department

 Cathedral Basilica of St. John the Baptist in Salto
 Holy Cross Parish Church in Salto
 Sacred Heart of Jesus Parish Church in Salto
 Parish Church of Our Lady of Mt. Carmel in Salto
 St. Joseph Parish Church in Pueblo Lavalleja

Diocese of San José de Mayo
The Roman Catholic Diocese of San José de Mayo covers San José Department and Flores Department:

San José Department

 Cathedral Basilica and National Sanctuary of St. Joseph in San José de Mayo
 Our Lady of the Orchard Chapel in San José de Mayo
 Our Lady of the Rosary of Pompei Parish Church in San José de Mayo
 Our Lady of Fatima Parish Church in San José de Mayo
 Christ the Redeemer Parish Church in Capurro
 Sacred Heart of Jesus Parish Church in Ecilda Paullier
 Parish Church of the Immaculate Conception and St. John Vianney in Estación González
 Parish Church of Our Lady of Sorrows and St. Isidore the Laborer in Libertad
 Parish Church of Our Lady of Lourdes and St. Raphael in Rafael Perazza
 St. Joseph the Worker Parish Church in Ciudad del Plata
 Delta del Tigre Parish Church in Ciudad del Plata
 Our Lady of the Rosary Parish Church in Rodríguez

Flores Department

 Most Holy Trinity Parish Church in Trinidad
 Our Lady of Luján Parish Church in Trinidad
 St. John the Baptist Chapel in Ismael Cortinas

Diocese of Tacuarembó
The Roman Catholic Diocese of Tacuarembó covers Rivera Department and Tacuarembó Department:

Tacuarembó Department

 St. Fructuosus Cathedral in Tacuarembó
 Holy Cross Parish Church in Tacuarembó
 St. Joseph Parish Church in Tacuarembó
 Our Lady of Lourdes Parish Church in Tacuarembó
 St. Joseph Parish Church in Achar
 Parish Church of Our Lady of Mt. Carmel in San Gregorio de Polanco
 Parish Church of the Holy Sacrament and St. Thérèse of Lisieux in Las Toscas
 Our Lady of Itatí Parish Church in Ansina, which is also a pilgrimage sanctuary
 St. Elizabeth Parish Church in Paso de los Toros

Rivera Department

 Church of the Immaculate Conception in Rivera
 Parish Church of St. Dominic in Rivera 
 Parish Church of the Sacred Heart in Rivera 
 St. Peter Parish Church in Rivera
 Sacred Heart Parish Church in Tranqueras
 St. John Bosco Parish Church in Minas de Corrales
 Parish Church of Mary Help of Christians in Vichadero

See also

Roman Catholic Church in Uruguay
List of cathedrals in Uruguay

References

 
Uruguay
Catholic